Beinn Each (813 m) is a mountain in the southern Grampian Mountains of Scotland. It is located in Stirlingshire, north of the town of Callander.

Rising steeply from the valley below, it makes for a straightforward climb from the nearby Loch Lubnaig and is often climbed in conjunction with the nearby Munro Stùc a' Chroin.

References

Marilyns of Scotland
Corbetts
Mountains and hills of Stirling (council area)
Mountains and hills of the Southern Highlands